Rumble or Rumbling may refer to:

Sounds and vibrations 
 Rumble (noise), a form of low frequency noise
 Rumble, a haptic feedback vibration feature in video game controllers
 Rumbling, a quality of a heart murmur
 Stomach rumble, or borborygmus, a medical term

Places
 Rumble, Shetland, an islet group off Whalsay, Scotland, UK
 Rumble, Indiana, US
 Rumble, West Virginia, US

People 
 Anthony Johnson (fighter), an American mixed martial artist nicknamed Rumble
 Dane Rumble (born 1982), New Zealand recording artist
 Darren Rumble (Australian rules footballer) (born 1984), Fremantle draftee
 Darren Rumble (ice hockey) (born 1969), Canadian ice hockey player and coach
 Mark Rumble, British television presenter on Studio Disney UK
 Paul Rumble (born 1969), English footballer
 Terry Rumble (born 1942), Australian politician
 Tony Rumble (1956–1999), American professional wrestler
 Mike Rumbles (born 1956), Scottish politician

Arts and entertainment

Films and television
 Rumble (2002 film), a Finnish film directed by Jani Volanen
 Rumble (2016 film), a Mexican film directed by R. Ellis Frazier
 Rumble: The Indians Who Rocked the World, a 2017 Canadian documentary
 Rumble (2021 film), an American film directed by Hamish Grieve
 Rumble (TV series), a short-lived British sitcom; see 1995 in British television#BBC1

Music

Albums
 The Rumble (Abhinanda album), 1999
 The Rumble (N2Deep album), 1998

Songs
 "Rumble" (instrumental), by Link Wray & His Raymen, 1958
 "Rumble" (Skrillex, Fred Again and Flowdan song), 2023
 "Rumble" (You Am I song), 1998
 "Rumble", by Excision and Space Laces, 2018
 "Rumble", by Kelis from Food, 2014
 "The Rumble", by MJ Cole and AJ Tracey, 2016
 "The Rumble", from the musical West Side Story, 1957
 "The Rumble"/"World's Crazy", by Róisín Murphy, 2018

Other uses in arts and entertainment
 Rumble, a puzzle in the MMORPG Puzzle Pirates

Sports and mascots 
 Rumble (slamball team), a team from Philadelphia, Pennsylvania, U.S.
 Royal Rumble, an annual WWE professional wrestling pay-per-view event
 Royal Rumble match, or The Rumble, the main attraction for the event
 Rumble the Bison, the mascot of the Oklahoma City Thunder in the NBA

Engineering
 Rumbling is an alternative name for tumble finishing

Other uses
 Rumble (website), video hosting service

See also 
 
 Earthquake
 Street fighting